Arthur Westlake Andrews (12 December 1868 – 22 November 1959) was a British geographer, poet, rock-climber, mountaineer and amateur tennis and badminton player.

He trained as a geographer (FRGS 1896), and became a teacher of geography and history in Southwark. In 1913 he published "a text-book of geography", reprinted in 1922.

Climber
As a climber, his first contribution appears to have been, in 1899, the route now called 'Andrews' renne' on Storen, Norway.

He is especially remembered for two later climbing contributions: for his co-authorship, with J. M. A. Thomson in 1909 of the first rock-climbing guide-book, to the cliffs of Lliwedd, in Snowdonia; and for being the 'father' of Cornish sea cliff climbing, beginning with an early ascent (1902) of the Bosigran Ridge Climb (aka Commando Ridge ) followed by Ledge Climb (also Bosigran) in 1905. With E. C. Pyatt he later produced the first official (Climbers' Club) Cornish climbing guide, in 1950.

He is also believed to have had a project to traverse all the British coastline, between the high and low water marks, aided where necessary by a rope, starting in Cornwall.

Badminton
He was a regular competitor at the All England Open Badminton Championships first appearing at the 1905 All England Badminton Championships and last appearing at the 1923 All England Badminton Championships.

Poetry
In later years he appears to have turned to poetry inspired by the scenery of West Penwith, Cornwall.

References

Further reading 
 Climbers Club Journal, 1997

External links

1868 births
1959 deaths
British mountain climbers
British geographers
British poets
Fellows of the Royal Geographical Society
British male poets
English male badminton players
English male tennis players
British male tennis players
Tennis people from East Sussex